Chilton County Airport , also known as Gragg-Wade Field, is a public-use airport in Chilton County, Alabama, United States. It is located one nautical mile (2 km) east of the central business district of Clanton, Alabama. It is owned by the Chilton County Airport Authority.

This airport is included in the FAA's National Plan of Integrated Airport Systems for 2011–2015 and 2009–2013, both of which categorized it as a general aviation facility.

Facilities and aircraft 
Chilton County Airport covers an area of 101 acres (41 ha) at an elevation of 585 feet (178 m) above mean sea level. It has one runway designated 8/26 with an asphalt surface measuring 4,008 by 100 feet (1,222 x 30 m).

For the 12-month period ending November 5, 2010, the airport had 23,924 general aviation aircraft operations, an average of 65 per day.

References

External links 

 Chilton County Airport at the Living New Deal
 Aerial image as of February 1997 from USGS The National Map
 
 

Airports in Alabama

Works Progress Administration in Alabama
Transportation buildings and structures in Chilton County, Alabama
National Register of Historic Places in Chilton County, Alabama
Historic districts in Chilton County, Alabama
Historic districts on the National Register of Historic Places in Alabama